Vitali Dzerbianiou or Derbenev (5 August 1976 – 2 May 2022) was a Belarusian weightlifter. His personal best combined lift was 280 kg.

He competed in Weightlifting at the 2008 Summer Olympics in the 56 kg division but failed to pass the heats.

He was prolific at the World Championships with participations in 1999, 2001, 2002, 2003, 2006 and 2007.

He was 5 ft 3 inches tall and weighed 132 lb. Dzerbianiou's death was announced on 2 May 2022.

References

External links
NBC profile
Vitali Dzerbianiou at Olympedia

1976 births
2022 deaths
People from Mogilev
Belarusian male weightlifters
Weightlifters at the 2000 Summer Olympics
Weightlifters at the 2004 Summer Olympics
Weightlifters at the 2008 Summer Olympics
Olympic weightlifters of Belarus
European Weightlifting Championships medalists
Place of death missing
Sportspeople from Mogilev Region